

See also
 List of Indiana state parks
 List of U.S. National Forests

External links 
 Official website for Indiana Department of Natural Resources
 Official magazine from the Indiana Department of Natural Resources

 State
Indiana
Lakes